The Green Line or Caravel Line is one of the four lines of Lisbon Metro.

Stations 

 Telheiras
 Campo Grande  
 Alvalade
 Roma
  
 Areeiro 
 Alameda 
 Arroios
 Anjos
 Intendente
 Martim Moniz
 Rossio
 Baixa-Chiado 
 Cais do Sodré

Frequency

Chronology

December 29, 1959: Opening of the original Lisbon Metro network with a Y shape. Common branch stations: Restauradores, Avenida, Rotunda (former name of the Marquês de Pombal station and where the line would split into the two branches). Current Blue Line branch stations (coming from Rotunda station): Parque, São Sebastião, Palhavã (former name of the Praça de Espanha station) and Sete Rios (former name of the Jardim Zoológico station). Current Yellow Line branch stations (coming from Rotunda station): Picoas, Saldanha, Campo Pequeno and Entre Campos.
 January 27, 1963: Opening of the Rossio station. Main branch route: Restauradores - Rossio.
 September 28, 1966: Opening of the Socorro (former name of the Martim Moniz station), Intendente and Anjos stations. Main branch route: Restauradores - Anjos.
 June 18, 1972: Opening of the Arroios, Alameda, Areeiro, Roma and Alvalade stations. Main branch route: Restauradores - Alvalade.
 October 15, 1988: Opening of the Cidade Universitária, Laranjeiras, Alto dos Moinhos and Colégio Militar/Luz stations. Current Blue Line branch route: Rotunda - Colégio Militar/Luz. Current Yellow Line branch route: Rotunda - Cidade Universitária.
 April 3, 1993: Opening of the Campo Grande station. Main branch route: Restauradores - Campo Grande. Current Yellow Line branch route: Rotunda - Campo Grande.
 July 15, 1995: Creation of the Blue and Yellow lines by building a second Rotunda station. New Blue line route: Colégio Militar/Luz - Campo Grande.
 October 18, 1997: Opening of the Carnide and Pontinha stations. Line route: Pontinha - Campo Grande.
 March 1, 1998: Palhavã station is renamed to Marquês de Pombal, Sete Rios station is renamed to Jardim Zoológico and Socorro station is renamed to Martim Moniz.
 March 3, 1998: Creation of the Blue and Green line by closing the Restauradores - Rossio tunnel. New Green line route: Rossio - Campo Grande.
 April 18, 1998: Opening of the Baixa-Chiado and Cais do Sodré stations. Line route: Cais do Sodré - Campo Grande.
 November 2, 2002: Opening of the Telheiras station. Line route: Cais do Sodré - Telheiras.

Future
Plans are in place to add two new stations (Santos and Estrela), connecting the Green Line at Cais do Sodré to the Yellow Line at Rato and creating a circle line with the merger of these two lines; this extension is currently on hold.

See also
 List of Lisbon metro stations

References

External links

Lisbon Metro lines
Railway lines opened in 1963